Honey Creek is a stream in the U.S. state of Iowa. It is a tributary to the Des Moines River.

Honey Creek was named for the honeybees along its course.

References

Rivers of Iowa
Rivers of Boone County, Iowa